A grave orb is a petrosphere that was put on a person's tomb. Grave orbs were made throughout Scandinavia from the Pre-Roman Iron Age until the Vendel era.

The grave orb could have been selected for its round shape or shaped by hand. They were then put in the centre of a burial site. Tumuli, stone circles and stone ships often have a reclined or raised central stone, and grave orbs derive from this practice. They were of ritual or symbolic significance.

Some grave orbs are engraved with ornaments, such as the orb at Inglinge hög or Barrow of Inglinge near Ingelstad in Småland, Sweden. Hög is from the Old Norse word haugr meaning  mound or barrow.

See also 

Stone balls
Stone spheres of Costa Rica
Carved stone balls of Scotland

Sources 

The article  'Gravklot'  in Nationalencyklopedin (1992).

Rock art in Europe
Archaeological artefact types
Prehistoric art
Prehistoric Scandinavia
Germanic archaeological artifacts
Migration Period
Stones